Scirtes is a genus of marsh beetles in the family Scirtidae. There are more than 80 described species in Scirtes.

Species
These 84 species belong to the genus Scirtes:

 Scirtes adustus Boheman, 1858
 Scirtes affinis Motschulsky, 1858
 Scirtes albamaculatus Watts.However, 2004
 Scirtes albotaeniatus Yoshitomi
 Scirtes auratus Watts, 2004
 Scirtes axillaris Motschulsky, 1863
 Scirtes babeldaobensis Yoshitomi
 Scirtes bimaculaticeps Pic, 1918
 Scirtes bo Klausnitzer, 2016
 Scirtes brisbanensis Pic, 1956
 Scirtes caledonicus Bourgeois, 1884
 Scirtes californicus Motschulsky, 1845
 Scirtes canescens Motschulsky, 1863
 Scirtes caraguata Libonatti, 2017
 Scirtes cayennensis Guérin, 1861
 Scirtes championi Picado, 1913
 Scirtes circumcisus Kirejtschuk & Nel, 2013
 Scirtes confinis
 Scirtes constans Pic, 1918
 Scirtes convexiusculus Motschulsky, 1863
 Scirtes dentatus Libonatti, 2017
 Scirtes dicerorhinus Klausnitzer, 2016
 Scirtes diversenotatus Pic, 1930
 Scirtes dufaui Pic, 1916
 Scirtes ebenus Ruta & Yoshitomi, 2010
 Scirtes elegans
 Scirtes elisabethae Pic, 1955
 Scirtes exoletus Waterhouse, 1880
 Scirtes flavohumeralis
 Scirtes gallus Libonatti, 2017
 Scirtes gelimensis Ruta, 2014
 Scirtes goliai Epler, 2012
 Scirtes goodrichi Springer & Waller, 2021
 Scirtes grandis (Motschulsky, 1863)
 Scirtes gressitti Yoshitomi
 Scirtes guillaumati Pic, 1918
 Scirtes haemisphaericus
 Scirtes helicoidalis Libonatti, 2017
 Scirtes helmsi Blackburn, 1892
 Scirtes hemisphaericus (Linnaeus, 1767)
 Scirtes herthae Klausnitzer, 2005
 Scirtes humeralis Horn, 1895
 Scirtes insularis Champion, 1897
 Scirtes japonicus Kiesenwetter, 1874
 Scirtes lemoulti Pic, 1913
 Scirtes lynnae Watts, Cooper & Saint, 2017
 Scirtes mahensis
 Scirtes majerorum Klausnitzer, 2016
 Scirtes maynei Pic, 1955
 Scirtes micronesianus Yoshitomi
 Scirtes nigropunctatus Motschulsky, 1863
 Scirtes nocturnus Pic, 1955
 Scirtes oblongus Guérin-Méneville, 1861
 Scirtes okinawanus Nakane, 1963
 Scirtes orbicularis (Panzer, 1793)
 Scirtes orbiculatus (Fabricius, 1801)
 Scirtes ovalis Blatchley, 1924
 Scirtes ovatulus Lewis, 1895
 Scirtes palauensis Yoshitomi
 Scirtes piceolus Blatchley, 1924
 Scirtes pinjarraensis Watts, 2004
 Scirtes plagiatus Schaeffer, 1906
 Scirtes quadrifossulata Pic, 1916
 Scirtes rufonotatus Pic, 1915
 Scirtes rutai Watts, Cooper & Saint, 2017
 Scirtes sakishimanus Satô & Chûjô, 1972
 Scirtes scheat Klausnitzer, 2003
 Scirtes serratus Watts, Cooper & Saint, 2017
 Scirtes seychellensis Champion, 1924
 Scirtes seydeli Pic, 1955
 Scirtes sobrinus Lewis, 1895
 Scirtes talamauensis Klausnitzer, 2016
 Scirtes testaceicornis Pic, 1913
 Scirtes testaceus Fabricius, 1801
 Scirtes tibialis Guerin-Meneville, 1843
 Scirtes tigmanensis
 Scirtes tinianensis Yoshitomi
 Scirtes townshendi Pic, 1918
 Scirtes tsumaguro Satô & Chûjô, 1972
 Scirtes variegata Guérin, 1843
 Scirtes victoris Pic, 1918
 Scirtes wanati Ruta & Yoshitomi, 2010
 Scirtes zerchei
 Scirtes zwicki Watts, Cooper & Saint, 2017
 Scyrtes japonicus Kiesenwetter, 1874

References

Further reading

External links

 

Scirtoidea
Articles created by Qbugbot